Eddie Adams is an American former racecar driver from Rising Sun, Maryland. He made two NASCAR starts; both at the circle track at Langhorne Speedway. He finished 34th in 1950 and 13th in 1952.

Racing career results

References

External links

Living people
People from Rising Sun, Maryland
Racing drivers from Maryland
NASCAR drivers
Year of birth missing (living people)